Dinmukhamet Akhimov (Dınmūhamed Tıleulesūly Äkımov; born August 8, 1948), known as "Dimash" ("Димаш") is a Kazakh actor, honoured artist of Kazakh Soviet Socialist Republic, holder of "Kurmet" and "Parasat" medals, member of Film-makers Association of the Republic of Kazakhstan.

Career
Dinmukhamet Akhimov has been acting since 1968. He graduated from a two-year course at "Kazakhfilm" picture studio. In 1970 he entered in the All-Union State Film Institute of Order of the Red Banner of Labour (Moscow) to the course of the People's Artist of USSR Boris Babochkin and in 1974 he successfully graduated from this Institute. His thesis work was a leading role in the play of William Shakespeare's "Othello" and a role of the city-provost in the play of Nikolai Gogol "The Inspector General" In 1987 he entered the stage direction faculty of Almaty State Art and Theatre Institute named after T. Zhurgenov (nowadays Cinema Academy), which he graduated from in 1990.

During his 48-year career in  acting he has appeared in over 100 films at 13 film studios of former USSR and non-CIS countries: Czechoslovakia, Poland, Germany, Italy, Switzerland, France, Japan, India, Iran, and others. He currently resides in Almaty, Kazakhstan.

In 1990, his work in cinematography was awarded the "Honoured Artist of Kazakh SSR".

In 2008 Dinmukhamet Akhimov received the "Kurmet" medal for the achievements in movies and TV industry.

In 2014, overcoming the language barrier, he played the role of a guide in the series “Marco Polo” produced by The Weinstein Company.

A year later, Akhimov played the role of crime boss Buzaubas in Nurtas Adambaev's film "Escape from the Village. Operation Mahabbat".

Filmography
Films in which Dinmukhamet Akhimov has appeared include the following.

References

External links

Kazakhstani male actors
1948 births
Living people
Soviet male actors
Recipients of the Order of Kurmet
21st-century Kazakhstani male actors
20th-century Kazakhstani male actors